Notoficula is a genus of sea snails, marine gastropod mollusks in the family Eratoidae.

Species
Species within the genus Notoficula include:

 Notoficula bouveti (Thiele, 1912)
 Notoficula otagoensis Dell, 1962
 Notoficula signeyensis Oliver, 1983
Species brought into synonymy
 Notoficula problematica Powell, 1951: synonym of Parficulina problematica(Powell, 1951)

References

 Oliver, P.G. (1983). Notoficula Thiele, a neotenous genus of eratoid gastropod from Antarctica. Br. Antarct. Surv. Bull 61: 1-6

External links

Eratoidae
Gastropod genera